Farn may refer to:

People
 Farn-Sasan (died 226), last king of the Indo-Parthian Kingdom
 Albert Brydges Farn (1841–1921), British entomologist
 Farn Carpmael (1908–1988), English rower 
 Michael Farn (born 1988), English ice hockey player

Other
 Farne Islands, England
 Fuerzas Armadas de la Resistencia Nacional, Salvadoran organisation